Piano Player is a compilation of recordings featuring jazz pianist Bill Evans released in 1998 on the Columbia label.

Reception
The Allmusic review by Scott Yanow awarded the album 4 stars stating "The pianist's fans will definitely want this consistently enjoyable CD". The All About Jazz review by Douglas Payne states "As a whole, Piano Player jumps from time periods and groupings more erratically than a typical Bill Evans listener would expect or appreciate. But eight of these songs offer required - and rewarding — listening for fans of the pianist. The remaining three selections are not readily available elsewhere either. Therefore, for now, Piano Player makes for essential Bill Evans listening".

Track listing
All compositions by Bill Evans unless otherwise noted
 "All About Rosie (3rd Section)" (George Russell) - 5:18
 "My Funny Valentine" (Lorenz Hart, Richard Rodgers) - 10:20
 "Vierd Blues" (Miles Davis) - 5:58
 "Bésame Mucho" (Consuelo Velázquez) - 6:53
 "Mornin' Glory" (Bobbie Gentry) - 6:43
 "Django" (John Lewis) - 8:08
 "Waltz for Debby" - 5:13
 "T.T.T. (Twelve Tone Tune)" - 3:37
 "Comrade Conrad" - 6:40
 "Gone with the Wind" (Allie Wrubel, Herb Magidson) - 6:42
 "Fun Ride" - 6:37
Recorded in New York City on June 10, 1956 (track 1), September 9, 1958 (track 2), February 6 & 8, 1962 (tracks 3 & 4), November 23, 1970 (track 5), November 24, 1970 (tracks 6-10) and May 17, 1971 (track 11)

Personnel 
Bill Evans - piano, electric piano
Miles Davis (track 2), Art Farmer (track 1), Louis Mucci (track 1) - trumpet
Jimmy Knepper - trombone (track 1)
Jim Buffington - French horn (track 1)
Robert Di Domenica - flute (track 1)
John LaPorta - alto saxophone (track 1)
Hal McKusick - tenor saxophone (track 1)
Manuel Zegler - bassoon (track 1)
Teddy Charles - vibes (track 1)
Margaret Rose - harp (track 1)
Barry Galbraith - guitar (track 1)
Joe Benjamin (track 1), Paul Chambers (track 2),  Eddie Gómez (tracks 5-11), Herbie Lewis (tracks 3 & 4) – bass
Jimmy Cobb (track 2), Marty Morell (track 11), Walter Perkins (tracks 3 & 4), Teddy Summer (track 1) – drums
George Russell - arranger, conductor (track 1)
Dave Pike - vibraphone (tracks 3 & 4)

References

Bill Evans albums
1998 compilation albums
Albums produced by Orrin Keepnews
Columbia Records compilation albums